|}

The King George V Stakes is a flat handicap horse race in Great Britain open to three-year-old horses. It is run at Ascot over a distance of 1 mile 3 furlongs and 211 yards (2,406 metres), and it is scheduled to take place each year in June on the third day of the Royal Ascot meeting.

Winners since 1984

See also
 Horse racing in Great Britain
 List of British flat horse races

References
Racing Post:

Ascot Racecourse
Flat races in Great Britain
Flat horse races for three-year-olds